A misericorde ( or ) (from French word miséricorde 'mercy') was a long, narrow knife, used from the High Middle Ages to deliver the death stroke (the mercy stroke, hence the name of the blade, derived from the Latin misericordia, "act of mercy") to a seriously wounded knight. The blade was thin enough to strike through the gaps between armour plates.

This weapon was used to dispatch knights who had received mortal wounds, which were not always quickly fatal in the age of bladed combat; it could also be used as a means of killing an active adversary, as during a grappling struggle. The blade could be pushed through the visor or eye holes in the helm with the aim of piercing the brain, or thrust through holes or weak points in plate armor, such as under the arm, with the aim of piercing the heart.  The weapon was known from the 12th century and has appeared in the armaments of Germany, Persia, and England. It was also used by Polish knights and/or princes from at least the 14th century.

See also 
 Rondel dagger
 Stiletto

Notes 

Daggers
Medieval blade weapons